The LGBT community of Sydney, in New South Wales, is the largest in Australia and has a firm place as one of the iconic gay cities of the contemporary world. In a 2013 Pew Research poll, 79% of Australians agreed that homosexuality should be accepted by society, making it the fifth most supportive country in the survey behind Spain (88%), Germany (87%), Canada and the Czech Republic (both 80%). With a long history of LGBT rights activism and the annual three-week-long Sydney Gay and Lesbian Mardi Gras festival, Sydney is one of the most gay-friendly cities in Australia and in the world.

History 
Prior to the colonial period, there is no record of homosexuality amongst the Indigenous Australians. Since the white colonisation of Australia in 1788 with the landing of the First Fleet at Sydney Cove and raising of the Union Flag by Arthur Phillip  Sydney has been associated with male homosexuality. As part of the British Empire, Australian colonies inherited anti-homosexuality laws such as the Buggery Act of 1533. These provisions were maintained in criminal sodomy laws passed by 19th century colonial parliaments, and subsequently by state parliaments after Federation. Same-sex sexual activity between men was considered a capital crime, resulting in the execution of people convicted of sodomy until 1890. The laws also punished sodomy between heterosexual partners, but did not apply to lesbian relationships. Oral sex as well as masturbation, whether heterosexual or homosexual, public or private, were also criminal offences.

Governor Phillip made it clear to the early convicts thatThere are two crimes that would merit death – murder and sodomy. For either of these crimes I would wish to confine the criminal till an opportunity offered of delivering him as a prisoner to the natives of New Zealand, and let them eat him. By 1796, the first cases of homosexuality were being reported and the first trial for sodomy, that of Francis Wilkinson took place. Over 30 years later, in 1828, Alexander Brown was the first person hanged for sodomy. Different jurisdictions gradually began to reduce the death penalty for sodomy to life imprisonment, with Victoria the last state to reduce the penalty in 1949. Community debate about decriminalising homosexual activity began in the 1960s, with the first lobby groups Daughters of Bilitis, the Homosexual Law Reform Society and the Campaign Against Moral Persecution formed in 1969 and 1970.

Twentieth Century

While Britain's influence on Australian political culture was still strong in the fifties there was no local appetite for a political response to the Wolfenden Committee, which recommended the decriminalisation of male homosexuality in Britain in 1957. Ten years later there was little comment from any Australian public figure (state or federal) when Britain finally de-criminalized homosexuality in England and Wales. Some historians have attributed this to the association of homosexuality with the 'convict stain'

in October 1973, former Prime Minister John Gorton put forward a motion in the federal House of Representatives that "in the opinion of this House homosexual acts between consenting adults in private should not be subject to the criminal law". All three major parties were given a conscience vote, and the motion was passed by 64 votes to 40.

Gay Neighbourhoods

During the Vietnam War, the Darlinghurst Road precinct, known as Kings Cross, became a popular destination for US military personnel on R&R – due chiefly to its proximity to a major naval facility. Partially as a result of this, the area gained a reputation as Australia's drugs and prostitution capital and also as one of the very early gay areas. Dozens of hotels constructed at the time ensured that "The Cross" remained a gay ghetto well into the 1990s.

In the years following the World War II, gay men started congregating in bars in Oxford Street, Darlinghurst and by 1969 gay bars such as Ivy's Birdcage and Capriccio's had opened. Queer life developed along the Oxford Street strip, which became known as The Golden Mile.

Demographics 
In 2014, over half a million people, or 3.0% of the adult Australian population, identified as gay, lesbian or "other". This included 268,000 people who identified as gay or lesbian and 255,000 people who identified as having an "other" sexual orientation. While New South Wales had just under a third of Australia's population, from the 2011 census, the state had 41% of Australia's male same-sex couples with the top ten suburbs for gay couples all in inner Sydney, including Darlinghurst, Potts Point, Kings Cross, Surry Hills, Alexandria, Lane Cove and Newtown.

Events 

The Sydney Gay & Lesbian Mardi Gras festival in Sydney, is attended by hundreds of thousands of people from around Australia and overseas. One of the largest such festivals in the world, Mardi Gras is the largest Pride event in Oceania. It includes a variety of events such as the Sydney Mardi Gras Parade and Party, Bondi Beach Drag Races, Harbour Party, the academic discussion panel Queer Thinking, Mardi Gras Film Festival, as well as Fair Day, which attracts 70,000 people to Victoria Park, Sydney.

The Sydney Gay & Lesbian Mardi Gras is one of Australia's biggest tourist drawcards, with the parade and dance party attracting many international and domestic tourists. It is New South Wales' second-largest annual event in terms of economic impact, generating an annual income of about 30 million for the state.

WorldPride Sydney 2023
In 2023, Sydney hosted WorldPride, attracting over 500,000 people to the 17-day festival, cementing Sydney as one the world's most prominent and iconic gay cities. Musical acts included celebrated gay icons, including Kylie Minogue, Charli XCX, Kim Petras, Kelly Rowland, Ava Max, Nicole Scherzinger and Jessica Mauboy.

References

Notes

See also
LGBT rights in Australia
Australian Marriage Law Postal Survey

 
Sydney